Vandiyur Mariamman Temple (Tamil:வண்டியூர் மாரியம்மன் திருக்கோயில்) is located in east of the temple city Madurai, Tamil Nadu, India. It is dedicated to Mariamman, the Hindu Goddess of rain. it is situated near to river Vaigai at a distance of about 3 km from the Meenakshi Amman Temple. Temple has its huge pond Vandiyur Mariamman Teppakulam. Although Mariammam Shrine is the prime shrine, temple has pechiammam(Tamil:பேச்சியம்மன்) and vinayagar beside the pipal tree. Two dwarapalakis located on the entrance of Mariamman shrine

Festivals
On Thaipusam, float festival is conducted in Teppakulam(tank) in a colourful way, which attracts thousands of tourists. In the month of mid-March to mid-April (Paṅkuni, twelfth month of Tamil calendar) the grand annual festival is celebrated for continuous ten day.

See also
Vandiyur Mariamman Teppakulam
Mariamman temples

References

Mariamman temples
Hindu temples in Madurai